"Land of Dreaming" is a song recorded by German band Masterboy. It was the third single from their album, Generation of Love. The song was released in January 1996 and features female vocals performed by Trixi Delgado. Several remixes were produced for the various formats, two of them were mixed by Italian Eurodance act Cappella. The song was a big success in Latín American countries Like Chile and México , but in Europe was unable to duplicate the same performances than Masterboy's previous hit singles. It reached its highest peak position in Germany where it was number 12 and charted for 17 weeks. It was also a top-20 hit in Switzerland, Finland and the Netherlands. In France, the song was ranked for ten weeks in the French top-50 Singles Chart and reached number 22. On the Eurochart Hot 100, "Land of Dreaming" peaked at number 42. In 2006, it was re-recorded in a remixed version with Freedom Williams and Linda Rocco in featuring and this version is included on Masterboy's 2006 studio album, US-Album.

Critical reception
British magazine Music Week rated the song three out of five, adding, "The German techno outfit mellow out on a reggae-lite tune but show their true colours on an uplifting Cappella remix."

Music video
The accompanying music video for "Land of Dreaming" was directed by Jonathan Bate and was shot in Dessert Atacama, Chile. Bate also directed the music video of "Generation of Love".

Track listings

 CD maxi
 "Land of Dreaming" (radio edit - gospel mix) — 3:34
 "Land of Dreaming" (gospel club mix) — 5:10
 "Land of Dreaming" (night club mix) — 6:08
 "Land of Dreaming" (album club mix) — 5:15
 "Land of Dreaming" (instrumental gospel mix) — 3:34
 "Land of Dreaming" (radio edit - night mix) — 3:57

 CD single
 "Land of Dreaming" (radio edit - gospel mix) — 3:34
 "Land of Dreaming" (night club mix) — 5:10

 12" maxi
 "Land of Dreaming" (album club mix) — 5:15
 "Land of Dreaming" (gospel club mix) — 5:10

 12" maxi - U.S.
 "Land of Dreaming" (extended mix) — 6:28
 "Land of Dreaming" (land of dub) — 7:32
 "Land of Dreaming" (dream dub) — 7:52
 "Land of Dreaming" (beats) — 1:55
 "Land of Dreaming" (radio mix) — 4:06

 CD maxi - Remixes
 "Land of Dreaming" (radio acoustic edit) — 3:14
 "Land of Dreaming" (radio U.S. mix) — 3:49
 "Land of Dreaming" (unit house mix) — 4:59
 "Land of Dreaming" (U.S. mix) — 4:58
 "Land of Dreaming" (unit house rapless mix) — 5:13
 "Land of Dreaming" (Cappella club mix) — 6:08
 "Land of Dreaming" (Cappella T.S.O.B. mix - the sound of Brescia) — 5:42

 12" maxi - Remixes
 "Land of Dreaming" (Cappella club mix) — 6:08  	
 "Land of Dreaming" (Cappella T.S.O.B. mix - the sound of Brescia) — 5:42
 "Land of Dreaming" (unit house rapless mix) — 5:13
 "Land of Dreaming" (night club mix) — 6:08

Credits
 Lyrics by Zabler, Skywalker and Schleh
 Music by Obrecht, Zabler and Schleh
 Mastered by J. Quincy Kramer
 Mixed by TTT
 Art direction by Polygram Creative Services
 Cover painting by Peter Mackens
 Sleeve design by Session Music Group
 Produced by Masterboy Beat Production
 Remixes by Misar and Uwe Wagenknecht (night club mix), Unit Production (unit house rapless mix), Masterboy Beat Production, Cappella

Charts

Weekly charts

Year-end charts

References

1996 singles
Masterboy songs
1996 songs
Polydor Records singles
Music videos directed by Jonathan Bate